Matthew Kepnes, is an American travel blogger.

Kepnes was born in Boston. At 23, he had never left the United States but in 2005 he took a trip to Thailand. The trip convinced Kepnes to quit his job, finish his MBA, and begin traveling the world and blogging about his experiences.

Kepnes' first book, How to Travel the World on $50 a Day: Travel Cheaper, Longer, Smarter, was published in 2013 by Penguin. He used an initial coin offering to crowdfund his eBook Nomadic Matt's Guide to Backpacking Europe in 2018. In July 2019, Kepnes published his memoir, Ten Years a Nomad: A Traveler's Journey Home.

Kepnes has traveled to more than 70 countries in his 7 years of traveling.

References

External links
Personal Site

1981 births
Living people
Writers from Boston
Travel
21st-century travel writers
American travel writers